Carmen Rischer ; born 16 May 1956 in Schwerte) is an individual Rhythmic Gymnast. She was the 1975 World All-around champion. She won the bronze medal in hoop at the 1980 European Championships in Amsterdam.

Biography 
Rischer first competed at the 1973 World Championships finishing 21st in the all-around. In 1975, The absence of rhythmic gymnasts from the Soviet Union, Bulgaria and East Germany. Western German athletes at the time, the highest ranked athletes remaining in contention meant Rischer and teammate Christiana Rosenberg competing at the 1975 World Championships in Madrid, Spain. Rischer went on to win the All-around title ahead of teammate Rosenberg, she also won the gold medal in Hoop and Ribbon and a silver medal for clubs. She competed in her last Worlds at the 1977 World Championships finishing 6th in all-around, she won silver in ribbon and placed 6th in ball.

References

External links

1956 births
Living people
German rhythmic gymnasts
Medalists at the Rhythmic Gymnastics World Championships
People from Schwerte
Sportspeople from Arnsberg (region)
20th-century German women
21st-century German women